The Wobbe index (WI) or Wobbe number is an indicator of the interchangeability of fuel gases such as natural gas, liquefied petroleum gas (LPG), and town gas and is frequently defined in the specifications of gas supply and transport utilities.

The Wobbe index is used to compare the combustion energy output of different composition fuel gases in an appliance (fire, cooker etc.). If two fuels have identical Wobbe indices then for given pressure and valve settings the energy output will also be identical. Typically variations of up to 5% are allowed as these would not be noticeable to the consumer.

The Wobbe index is a critical factor to minimise the impact of the changeover when analyzing the use of substitute natural gas (SNG) fuels such as propane-air mixtures. The Wobbe index also requires the addition of propane to some upgraded biomethane products, particularly in regions where natural gas has a high calorific value such as Sweden.

The Wobbe index has its origins in the 1920's with Italian physicist and engineer Goffredo Wobbe.

Wobbe index of common fuel gases

Note: 1 Joule = .

Usage
The Wobbe index is expressed in MJ/Nm³ (where the ill-advised symbol 'Nm³' is intended to mean 'm³ in Normal conditions, much against the BIPM prescription for writing SI units), or sometimes in BTU/scf. In the case of natural gas (molar mass 17 g/mol), the typical heating value is around 39 MJ/Nm³ (1,050 BTU/scf) and the specific gravity is approximately 0.59, giving a typical Wobbe index of 51 MJ/Nm³ (1,367 BTU/scf).

There are three ranges or "families" of fuel gases that have been internationally agreed based on Wobbe index. Family 1 covers manufactured gases, family 2 covers natural gases (with high and low ranges) and family 3 covers liquefied petroleum gas (LPG). Combustion equipment is typically designed to burn a fuel gas within a particular family: hydrogen-rich town gas, natural gas or LPG.

Other flame characteristics and composition limits may determine the acceptability of the replacement gas, e.g. flame speed, "yellow tipping" due to incomplete combustion, sulfur content, oxygen content, etc.

Limitations

In spite of its usefulness, Wobbe index alone is not a good indicator of the interchangeability of two or more gases, or mixtures of them. It is necessary to bear in mind other criteria while determining the plenty substitution of a fuel by other, different of the one used to adjust the burning system.

References

Fuel gas
Gas technologies